Parawarthana (The Reflections), is a 2014 Sinhala-language Sri Lankan drama thriller film directed by cinematographer Jayanath Gunawardhana. The film co-produced by Mohammad Mujahid, Ranganath Dias with the director himself for Through the Lens Films. It stars Somy Rathnayake, Pubudu Chathuranga and Dulani Anuradha in lead roles along with Geetha Kanthi Jayakody and Bimal Jayakody. The score has been done by Dinesh Subasinghe. It is the 1200th Sri Lankan film in the Sinhala cinema.

Plot 
The plot was based on Buddhist teachings of universal justice, retribution.

The story starts calmly with simple things happening in a folk village near Anuradhapura. Rathane Aiya portrays a saintly person who lives in the neighborhood of a mother and two sons Jayasena and Siripala. The day before the poya, Siripala kills his elder brother. Rathne is the crime suspect and arrested. He is sentenced to death on the gallows.

While awaiting death, he confesses his bad behavior during his past. He thrived in terrorising the village with ill-gotten money and power. He came there to evade punishment for a double murder.
Since then he has tried to live a good life, putting his past behind him, becoming a 'good samaritan' who is respected by all. Siripala gets shot and confesses that he killed Jayasena.

Cast 
 Somy Rathnayake as Rathne
 Pubudu Chathuranga as Siripala
 Dulani Anuradha as Kusum
 Nalin Pradeep Udawela as Jayasena
 Geetha Kanthi Jayakody as Vimalawathi
 Maureen Charuni as Kusum's mother
 Sarath Kothalawala as Kusum's father
 Sithuni Mallawarachchi as Kusum's daughter
 Sanjaya Leelarathna as Prison SP
 Janaka Ranasinghe as Thotiya
 Ariyasiri Gamage as Police Sergent
 Bimal Jayakody as The Police OIC
 Amila Nadeeshani as OIC's wife
 Nilmini Kottege as Chandralatha
 Damitha Saluwadana as Chandare's mother

References

External links

Films.lk

2014 films
2010s Sinhala-language films